Cantrainea inexpectata is a species of small sea snail with calcareous opercula, a marine gastropod mollusk in the family Colloniidae.

Distribution
This marine species is endemic to New Zealand.

References

External links
 To Encyclopedia of Life
 To World Register of Marine Species

Colloniidae
Gastropods described in 1979